Linwood Leon Clark (March 21, 1876 – November 18, 1965) was a U.S. representative who represented the second Congressional district of the state of Maryland from 1929 to 1931.

Biography
Clark was born in Aberdeen, Maryland, and attended the public schools as a youth.  He graduated from Milton Academy of Milton, Massachusetts, in 1899, from the American University of Harriman in Harriman, Tennessee, in 1902, and from the law department of the University of Maryland in 1904.  He was admitted to the bar the same year and commenced practice in Baltimore, Maryland.  He also completed a La Salle Extension University course in railway transportation in 1919.

He married Linnie Habersank on July 24, 1907, and they had two children.

In 1926 Clark was an unsuccessful candidate for election to U.S. Congress, but two years later was successful, serving one term from March 4, 1929, to March 3, 1931.  He was an unsuccessful candidate for reelection in 1930, and resumed the practice of law in Baltimore.  He served as judge of the circuit court of Maryland, fifth judicial district from 1935 to 1938.  He practiced law in Annapolis, Maryland, where he died in 1965. He is interred in Woodlawn Cemetery of Baltimore.

References

1876 births
1965 deaths
People from Aberdeen, Maryland
Milton Academy alumni
University of Maryland, Baltimore alumni
Maryland lawyers
Maryland state court judges
Republican Party members of the United States House of Representatives from Maryland
People from Baltimore